Virginia elected its members in April 1807, after the Congress began but before the first session met.

See also 
 Virginia's 13th congressional district special election, 1806
 United States House of Representatives elections, 1806 and 1807
 List of United States representatives from Virginia

Notes 

1807
Virginia
United States House of Representatives